Auguste Delacroix, a French marine painter, was born on 27 January 1809 at Boulogne, and died there in 1868. He produced some elegant sea-pieces taken on the French and North African coasts, and also painted some African genre pictures.

References
 

1809 births
1868 deaths
19th-century French painters
French male painters
French marine artists
People from Boulogne-sur-Mer
19th-century French male artists